Democratic Federal Yugoslavia was a charter member of the United Nations from its establishment in 1945 as the Socialist Federal Republic of Yugoslavia until 1992 during the Yugoslav Wars. During its existence the country played a prominent role in the promotion of multilateralism and narrowing of the Cold War divisions in which various UN bodies were perceived as important vehicles. Yugoslavia was elected a non-permanent member of the United Nations Security Council on multiple occasions in periods between 1950–1951, 1956, 1972–1973, and 1988–1989, which was in total 7 (out of 47) years of Yugoslav membership in the organization. The country was also one of 17 original members of the Special Committee on Decolonization.

In 1980 under the chairmanship of  Belgrade hosted the 21st UNESCO General Conference as the seventh host city in the world. The city also hosted the UNCTAD VI Conference in 1983. Yugoslav diplomat Stanoje Simic was one of the candidates at the 1946 United Nations Secretary-General selection, while Lazar Mojsov was 34th President of the United Nations General Assembly. Yugoslav diplomats were Presidents of the United Nations Economic and Social Council in the 1946 3rd session (Andrija Štampar, Acting), 1982 (Miljan Komatina), and from January until June 1992 (Darko Šilović). The country was one of the founding members of the Group of 77 as well as the presiding country of the group in 1985–1986.

After the breakup of Yugoslavia, its seat at the United Nations was not inherited and continued directly by any of the six federal republics due to the shared state succession acknowledged in the United Nations Security Council Resolution 777. Instead, they all applied for membership as new member states. For some time the rump Federal Republic of Yugoslavia resisted this interpretation and it rejoined the UN only in 2000, after the overthrow of Slobodan Milošević, as a new member state. It changed the name to the State Union of Serbia and Montenegro in 2003, and its seat was transferred to Serbia in 2006 following Montenegro's independence. UN's reaction to Yugoslav crisis included establishment of the UNPROFOR and UNCRO missions, UNTAES and UNMIK transitional administrations as well as the International Criminal Tribunal for the former Yugoslavia (ICTY). Those establishments influenced development of the United Nations peacekeeping and the establishment of the permanent International Criminal Court.

History

Federal People's Republic of Yugoslavia / Socialist Federal Republic of Yugoslavia (1945–1992)

Yugoslavia joined the UN as an original member on 24 October 1945. Initially part of the Cominform, Yugoslavia under the leadership of Josip Broz Tito was eventually expelled from it in a culmination of political conflict between the Soviet and Yugoslav state leaderships, known as the Tito–Stalin split. The country onwards never joined the Warsaw Pact and continued to pursue policies independent from the Soviet Bloc, and subsequently became a founding member of the Non-Aligned Movement.

It was a multi-ethnic state which Tito was able to maintain through a doctrine of "brotherhood and unity", but tensions between ethnicities began to escalate with the Croatian Spring of 1970–71, a movement for greater Croatian autonomy, which was suppressed. This was followed with favorable constitutional changes, as the 1974 Yugoslav Constitution devolved many federal powers to the constituent republics and provinces. After Tito's death in 1980 ethnic tensions grew, beginning with the 1981 protests in Albanian-majority SAP Kosovo. In the late 1980s, Serbian leader Slobodan Milošević used the Kosovo crisis to stoke up Serb nationalism and attempt to consolidate and dominate the country, which alienated the other ethnic groups.

During 1990, the communists lost power to separatist parties in the first multi-party elections held across the country, except in Serbia and Montenegro, where they were won by Milošević and his allies. Nationalist rhetoric on all sides became increasingly heated. In 1991, one republic after another proclaimed independence (only Serbia and Montenegro remained federated), but the status of Serb minorities outside Serbia was left unsolved. After a string of inter-ethnic incidents, the Yugoslav Wars ensued, first in Croatia and then, most severely, in multi-ethnic Bosnia and Herzegovina; the wars left long-term economic and political damage in the region.

In November 1991, the Arbitration Commission of the Peace Conference on Yugoslavia, led by Robert Badinter, concluded at the request of Lord Carrington that the SFR Yugoslavia was in the process of dissolution, that the Serbian population in Croatia and Bosnia did not have a right to self-determination in the form of new states, and that the borders between the republics were to be recognized as international borders. As a result of the conflict, the United Nations Security Council unanimously adopted UN Security Council Resolution 721 on 27 November 1991, which paved the way to the establishment of the United Nations Protection Force in Yugoslavia. In January 1992, Croatia and Yugoslavia signed an armistice under UN supervision, while negotiations continued between Serb and Croat leaderships over the partitioning of Bosnia and Herzegovina.

On 15 January 1992, the independence of Croatia and Slovenia was recognized worldwide. By then, it had been effectively dissolved into five independent states, which were all subsequently admitted to the UN:

 Bosnia and Herzegovina, Croatia, and Slovenia were admitted to the UN on 22 May 1992.
 Macedonia was admitted to the UN on 8 April 1993, being provisionally referred to for all purposes within the UN as "The former Yugoslav Republic of Macedonia" , due to pressure from Greece, pending settlement of the difference that had arisen over its name. Following the ratification of the Prespa Agreement, the country renamed itself North Macedonia on 12 February 2019.

Due to the dispute over its legal successor states, the member state "Yugoslavia", referring to the former Socialist Federal Republic of Yugoslavia, remained on the official roster of UN members for many years after its effective dissolution. Following the admission of all five states as new UN members, "Yugoslavia" was removed from the official roster of UN members.

Federal Republic of Yugoslavia / Serbia and Montenegro (2000–2006)

The government of the Federal Republic of Yugoslavia, established on 28 April 1992 as a rump state by the remaining Yugoslav republics of Montenegro and Serbia, claimed itself as the legal successor state of the former Socialist Federal Republic of Yugoslavia; however, on 30 May 1992, United Nations Security Council Resolution 757 was adopted, by which it imposed international sanctions on the Federal Republic of Yugoslavia due to its role in the Yugoslav Wars, and noted that "the claim by the Federal Republic of Yugoslavia (Serbia and Montenegro) to continue automatically the membership of the former Socialist Federal Republic of Yugoslavia in the United Nations has not been generally accepted," and on 22 September 1992, United Nations General Assembly Resolution A/RES/47/1 was adopted, by which it considered that "the Federal Republic of Yugoslavia (Serbia and Montenegro) cannot continue automatically the membership of the former Socialist Federal Republic of Yugoslavia in the United Nations," and therefore decided that "the Federal Republic of Yugoslavia (Serbia and Montenegro) should apply for membership in the United Nations and that it shall not participate in the work of the General Assembly". The Federal Republic of Yugoslavia refused to comply with the resolution for many years, but following the ousting of President Slobodan Milošević from office, it re-applied for membership, and was admitted to the UN on 1 November 2000 as a new member. On 4 February 2003, the Federal Republic of Yugoslavia had its official name changed to Serbia and Montenegro, following the adoption and promulgation of the Constitutional Charter of Serbia and Montenegro by the Assembly of the Federal Republic of Yugoslavia.

On the basis of a referendum held on 21 May 2006, Montenegro declared independence from Serbia and Montenegro on 3 June 2006. In a letter dated on the same day, the President of Serbia informed the United Nations Secretary-General that the membership of Serbia and Montenegro in the UN was being continued by Serbia, following Montenegro's declaration of independence, in accordance with the Constitutional Charter of Serbia and Montenegro. Montenegro was admitted to the UN on 28 June 2006.

See also 

 Member states of the United Nations
 International Center for Promotion of Enterprises (Ljubljana)
 Yugoslavia and the Non-Aligned Movement
 Yugoslavia and the European Economic Community
 Foreign relations of Serbia
 Serbia and the United Nations
 Montenegro in intergovernmental organizations
 Serbia in intergovernmental organizations
 Museum of Yugoslavia
 Archives of Yugoslavia

References

Bibliography

External links
 Official website of the Permanent Mission of Serbia to the UN
 Official website of the Ministry of Foreign Affairs of Serbia

 
History of Yugoslavia
Foreign relations of Yugoslavia